Adult Contemporary is a chart published by Billboard ranking the top-performing songs in the United States in the adult contemporary music (AC) market.  In 1976, 40 singles topped the chart, then published under the title Easy Listening.  Through the issue of Billboard dated February 14, the header of the chart stated that it listed "best-selling middle-of-the-road singles compiled from national retail sales and radio station airplay".  With effect from the following week's issue, the reference to retail sales was removed and the header stated that the chart was based on radio airplay only.

Captain & Tennille, John Denver and Olivia Newton-John tied for the most number-one singles in 1976, each achieving three chart-toppers.   Captain & Tennille's total of six weeks at number one was the most by any act, and the duo's song "Muskrat Love" had the highest number of weeks at number one by a single, spending four non-consecutive weeks in the top spot.  No song spent more than two consecutive weeks at number one during the year.  Husband-and-wife duo Captain & Tennille were at the peak of their success in 1976, gaining a series of gold discs, but their career would shortly go into decline and they would achieve no further AC number ones.

A number of Easy Listening number ones of 1976 also topped Billboards all-genre chart, the Hot 100, including "50 Ways to Leave Your Lover" by Paul Simon and John Sebastian's "Welcome Back", the theme from the television show "Welcome Back, Kotter".  "Silly Love Songs" by Wings and "Don't Go Breaking My Heart" by Elton John and Kiki Dee topped both charts and were named the top two songs in Billboards year-end chart of pop singles, although the magazine noted that the soft sounds which had been popular on pop music radio in recent years were beginning to be displaced by the "funkier" sounds of disco and soul.  Frankie Avalon was one artist who embraced the increasingly-popular disco style but still received sufficient spins on relevant radio stations to top the Easy Listening chart, as he reached number one with a disco-influenced re-recording of his own 1959 hit "Venus". The final Easy Listening number one of the year was "Torn Between Two Lovers" by Mary MacGregor, which would go on to top the Hot 100 early the following year.

Chart history

a.  Double A-sided single

References

See also
1976 in music
List of artists who reached number one on the U.S. Adult Contemporary chart

1976
1976 record charts